Corley is a village in Warwickshire, England.

Corley may also refer to:

Places in the United States
Corley (surname)
Corley, Arkansas, US, an unincorporated community
Corley, Iowa, US, an unincorporated community
Corley, Texas, US, an unincorporated community
Corley, Barbour County, West Virginia
Corley, Braxton County, West Virginia

Other
Corley services, a motorway services located near the English village
The Corley Conspiracy, an opera
C.E. Corley House, a historic home near Lexington, Kentucky
A character in several Lenehan and Corley stories by James Joyce

See also

Curley (disambiguation)